Andreas Cervin (31 October 1888 – 14 February 1972) was a Swedish gymnast  who competed in the 1908 Summer Olympics. He was a member of the Swedish team that won the all-around gold medal.

Born to a priest, Cervin graduated in law from the University of Lund in 1914, and the same year began to work as a clerk in the Göta Court of Appeal. In 1918 he moved to the Municipal Court in Gothenburg, in 1935 became an alderman, and retired in 1955. 

Cervin was known for his fearless and straightforward character, and for his opposition to the Swedish Coalition Government during World War II. In the 1944 city mayor elections he collected twice more votes than his strongest opponent, Gösta Bäärnhielm, yet the Government dismissed the results and appointed Bäärnhielm.

References

1888 births
1972 deaths
Swedish male artistic gymnasts
Gymnasts at the 1908 Summer Olympics
Olympic gymnasts of Sweden
Olympic gold medalists for Sweden
Olympic medalists in gymnastics

Medalists at the 1908 Summer Olympics
19th-century Swedish people
20th-century Swedish people